The 1987 San Jose Earthquakes season was the fourteenth overall for the Earthquakes franchise, and the club's third in the Western Soccer Alliance. The Earthquakes finished the
season in third place, then shut out the second place Seattle Storm in the Wild Card playoff game. In the Final, they were defeated by 
the San Diego Nomads, 3-1.

Squad
The 1987 squad

Competitions

Western Soccer Alliance

Match results

Season

Playoffs 

* = Penalty kicksSource:

Standings

References

External links
The Year in American Soccer – 1987 | WSA
San Jose Earthquakes Game Results | Soccerstats.us
https://commons.wikimedia.org/wiki/File:San_Jose_Earthquakes_1987.jpg

San Jose Earthquakes seasons
San Jose
1987 in sports in California